Rowland G. Freeman III (February 11, 1922 – November 29, 2014) was an American United States Navy officer who served as Administrator of the General Services Administration from 1979 to 1981.

He died on November 29, 2014, in Williamsburg, Virginia at age 92.

References

1922 births
2014 deaths
United States Navy rear admirals
Administrators of the General Services Administration
Carter administration personnel